Vasool ( Money Recovery) is a 2008 Tamil language action drama film directed, produced and written by V. Rishiraj. The film stars newcomer Hemanth Kumar, Kiran Rathod and V. Rishiraj, with Besant Ravi, Mahanadi Shankar, Alex, Pallavi, Ashwatha, Fathima Babu, Lavanya, and K. R. Vatsala playing supporting roles. The film had musical score by Vijay Shankar and was released on 12 September 2008. The film was also dubbed into Telugu as Vasool Rani and was released on 12 March 2010 by Lakshmi Balaji Cinema Productions.

Plot
Jeeva (Hemanth Kumar) is an auditor who handles the finances of the popular cinema actress Kiran (Kiran Rathod). He is madly in love with her. Jeeva's best friend Jinda (V. Rishiraj) is the most notorious gangster of Chennai. On one hand, he is a cold-blooded and dangerous person for his enemies, and on the other hand, he is a kindhearted person for his family and friends. He is married and has a kid. When Jeeva had to leave his village after an argument with his father, Jinda hosted his friend in his home and helped Jeeva financially. Jeeva became an auditor and started to work for the popular actress Kiran. They got close and eventually fell in love with each other. Kiran wants him to keep their love a secret because of her celebrity status. Thereafter, Jinda is shocked to discover his friend being in love with Kiran. He advises Jeeva to forget Kiran, but Jeeva refuses to listen to his friend. Jinda then reveals that he had enjoyed Kiran's sexual favours on several occasions. Jeeva is shocked at the news, so he compels Kiran to explain about his friend's accusation. Finally, Kiran admits that she had several casting couch experiences with producers and had to sleep with influential bigwigs like Jinda for her own benefit. During the initial stages of her acting career, she struggled a lot to shake off key roles, therefore to attain a top position in the industry, she made some compromises on the personal front. Kiran then confesses that she does not believe in love and that money is the most important thing in life for her. Unable to bear this bitter truth, Jeeva, who was sincerely in love with Kiran, drowns his sorrow in liquor. Being duped for too long by the greedy and opportunist Kiran, Jeeva decides to abduct her. Jinda tracks down Jeeva, and he stops Jeeva killing Kiran. Jinda tells Kiran that she is immoral and a disgrace to humanity, then he chokes her to death right in front of Jeeva.

Cast

Hemanth Kumar as Jeeva
Kiran Rathod as Kiran
V. Rishiraj as Jinda
Alex as Geetha's father
K. R. Vatsala as Jinda's mother
Ashwatha as Jinda's wife
Mahanadi Shankar as Mumbai Kasi
Fathima Babu as Angayarkanni
Lavanya as Geetha
Besant Ravi as Thadal Govindan
Pallavi
Kadhal Saravanan as Film Director
Dhadha Muthukumar as Seval
Sabarna Anand as Mallika
Vrishi Kapoor
Vasanth Raman
Suja Varunee in a special appearance

Soundtrack

Both the film's score and the soundtrack were composed by Vijay Shankar. The soundtrack, released in 2008, features 7 tracks with lyrics written by Snehan, Viveka, G. B. and Vijay Shankar.

References

2008 films
2000s Tamil-language films
Indian action films
Indian gangster films
Films shot in Chennai
Films about actors
2008 action films